Thoothukudi is a 2006 Indian Tamil-language gangster film set in the Thoothukudi district of Tamil Nadu directed by Sanjay Ram. The film starred Harikumar, a prominent dance choreographer in Tamil films, in the lead role alongside Karthika and Rahman.

Cast 
Harikumar as Mahadevan
Karthika as Mallika
Rahman as Lingam
Navin Balaji as Esaki
Swetha as Esaki's wife

Production
The film marked the acting debut of dance choreographer Harikumar and actress Karthika in leading roles. Karthika was cast in the film after the makers had spotted her in a commercial. The relative success of the film prompted Karthika to be labelled as 'Thootukudi' Karthika or 'Karuvappaiya' Karthika by the media. Harikumar and Karthika worked together again in Madurai Sambavam (2009).

Music
Pravin Mani composed the songs and scored the background music. The song "Karuvappaiya" from the song garnered popularity prior to release, with actress Karthika's display in the song noted. Following the album, Pravin and Harikumar came together again for their next venture, Thirutham.

Reception 
Sify gave the film a negative review and wrote that "On the whole, the script is wafer thin, there is no logic and is too dark and morbid". Malini Mannath of Chennai Online noted that "Though it's a predictable storyline, the director has attempted to bring in slight variations and the film does have its interesting moments and elements". The film performed well at the box office, with director Sanjay Ram receiving more offers to work on films.

The film's positive response prompted director Sanjay Ram to work on a sequel titled Kiliyanthattu Thoothukudi 2 during 2013.

References

2006 films
2000s crime films
Indian crime films
2000s Tamil-language films
Films directed by Sanjay Ram